Maurice Richardson (1907–1978) was an English journalist and short story writer.

Life and career 
Richardson was born to a wealthy family. As a child, Richardson was sent to prep school, which he disliked; he later recalled his education in his 1968 book Little Victims. He studied at Oxford in the 1920s, where he befriended the poet Brian Howard. After leaving Oxford, he spent some time as an amateur boxer, and wrote his first novel, A Strong Man Needed, a humorous story about a female boxer. Richardson began his journalistic career in the 1930s. After joining the Communist Party, Richardson became a contributor to Left Review and a member of the London-based left-wing Writers and Readers Group which included Randall Swingler, Sylvia Townsend Warner, Mulk Raj Anand, Arthur Calder-Marshall and Rose Macaulay.

In the late 1940s, Richardson became a contributor to the British magazine Lilliput. Here he published a series of humorous fantasy stories about a "Dwarf Surrealist Boxer" named Engelbrecht. These tales were illustrated by several noted artists, including Ronald Searle, Gerard Hoffnung and James Boswell. The series was collected in book form as The Exploits of Engelbrecht in 1950; it was later reprinted in 1977 and in a deluxe edition by Savoy Books in 2000. David Langford has praised The Exploits of Engelbrecht for their "enjoyable absurdist humour"; J. G. Ballard also admired the stories, describing them as "English surrealism at its greatest. Witty and fantastical, Maurice Richardson was light years ahead of his time. Unmissable."

After leaving the Communist Party in the 1950s, Richardson worked as a book reviewer. Richardson also became known for arranging meetings between himself and other writers in London pubs. Guests at these meetings included Jeffrey Bernard, Daniel Farson, Swingler, Lionel Bart, Frank Norman and Alan Rawsthorne. In the 1960s, he also worked as the Observer's television critic and wrote sports journalism for The Guardian. Richardson also wrote a study of snakes, lizards and other reptiles entitled The Fascination of Reptiles.

After Richardson's death, a posthumous collection of journalism, Fits and Starts, was issued. Reviewing Fits and Starts, Mary Manning praised the book, particularly Richardson's essay on the Moors murders, which she described as "a masterpiece in this genre".

Bibliography

Fiction 

 A Strong Man Needed (1931)
 My Bones will keep (1932)
 The Bad Companions (1936)
 The Exploits of Engelbrecht, abstracted from the Chronicles of the Surrealist Sportsman's Club (1950)
 Underworld Nights (1956) (published under the pseudonym Charles Raven)

Non-Fiction 

 London's Burning: An account of the experiences of an Auxiliary Fireman (1941).
 Thanatos : a modern symposium (with Philip Toynbee) (1963)
 Little Victims (1968)
 The Fascination of Reptiles (Illustrated by Shaun Milne ) (1973)
 Fits & starts : Collected Pieces (introduction by Julian Symons)

As editor 

 Novels of Mystery from the Victorian Age (1945). Contains: Sheridan Le Fanu (Carmilla), Anon (The Notting Hill Mystery), Wilkie Collins (The Woman in White), Robert Louis Stevenson (Dr. Jekyll and Mr. Hyde).
 Midnight Tales  by W. F. Harvey (1946)
 Best Mystery Stories (1968)
 Old Saint Paul's by William Harrison Ainsworth (1968)

See also 

 List of short story authors

References

External links 

 

English literary critics
English male journalists
English short story writers
English fantasy writers
1907 births
1978 deaths
20th-century English novelists
English male short story writers
English male novelists
20th-century British short story writers
20th-century English male writers